Raúl Gaitán Ballesteros (born 10 September 1979) is a Spanish retired footballer who played as a right back.

Football career
Born in Málaga, Andalusia, Gaitán finished his youth career with local Málaga CF, but played lower league and amateur football until the age of nearly 23, successively representing Atlético Malagueño, Real Valladolid B, UD Los Barrios, Juventud de Torremolinos CF, Lucena CF and Andalucía CF. In the 2002–03 season he first arrived in Segunda División B, signing for CD Toledo.

In summer 2007, after four years with three clubs which included UD Marbella, Gaitán returned to Málaga, with the first team competing in Segunda División. He made his professional debut on 5 September, scoring in a 2–1 home win against Celta de Vigo for the campaign's Copa del Rey; on 17 November he first appeared in the league, netting in his own goal in a 4–2 triumph over Racing de Ferrol also at La Rosaleda Stadium.

Gaitán played in the third level in the following years, with Polideportivo Ejido, Unión Estepona CF and Real Jaén. The 33-year-old helped the latter side achieve promotion at the end of 2012–13, scoring twice in 35 games.

References

External links

1979 births
Living people
Footballers from Málaga
Spanish footballers
Association football defenders
Segunda División players
Segunda División B players
Tercera División players
Atlético Malagueño players
Real Valladolid Promesas players
UD Los Barrios footballers
Lucena CF players
Málaga CF players
CD Toledo players
UD Fuengirola Los Boliches players
Marbella FC players
Polideportivo Ejido footballers
Real Jaén footballers